KBLY (100.5 MHz) is a radio station licensed to Newcastle, Texas broadcasting a new Christian radio format containing both Contemporary Christian Praise and Country Gospel music. The station is owned by Positive Radio Network, LLC and has offices and a studio in Graham, Texas.

History
KBLY came on the air early in December 2016 playing ad-free Christmas music. On December 26, 2016 KBLY flipped to its full-time format of Contemporary Christian Praise and Country Gospel. In 2018, the station was sold to Positive Radio Network, LLC, along with the permit for KCKB, for $87,000. The sale price represented forgiveness of an outstanding debt owed to Positive Radio Network by previous owners Two Way Communications, LLC; the sale was consummated on January 3, 2019.

Programming
KBLY plays a unique mix of music and also provides long-form talk and public service programs.

Music
The music format, a mix of Contemporary Christian Praise and Country Gospel, is new to the Christian Radio industry and could be likened to a secular Bob or Jack FM format popular in larger markets.

Long-form talk and public service programs
KBLY provides air-time to several churches within its listening area, as well as rebroadcasting the radio show Pathway to Victory with Robert Jefress.

Sports
KBLY also provides seasonal sports to its listening area; including the Texas Rangers and Dallas Cowboys.

References

External links
 

BLY (FM)
2016 establishments in Texas
Radio stations established in 2016